USS Deede (DE-263) was an  in the United States Navy.

Namesake
LeRoy Clifford Deede was born on 5 February 1916 in Woodworth, North Dakota. He enlisted in the United States Naval Reserve on 2 July 1937 and was appointed a Naval Aviator on 21 September 1938. He was awarded the Distinguished Flying Cross for his outstanding service while commanding a PBY Catalina during a bombing attack on a Japanese naval force in Jolo Harbor, Sulu, Philippines, 27 December 1941. With his plane crippled after destroying a Japanese plane which tried to down him, Deede crash landed at sea where he and his crew could be rescued. Lieutenant (junior grade) Deede was killed in action on 17 June 1942 in the Asiatic area.

Construction and commissioning
Deede was launched 6 April 1943 by Boston Navy Yard; sponsored by Mrs. M. B. Deede, mother of Lieutenant (junior grade) Deede; and commissioned 29 July 1943.

World War II Pacific operations 
Deede arrived at Pearl Harbor on 17 November 1943. She got underway on 26 November for the invasion of the Gilberts, screened a convoy to Tarawa, then patrolled off Makin until 23 December when she returned to Pearl Harbor.

Deede arrived at Majuro on 3 February 1944 for service as harbor pilot and patrol vessel during the occupation of that island. She returned to Pearl Harbor for training exercises from 21 February to 26 March, then escorted convoys between Majuro and Pearl Harbor until 26 May. She sailed from Pearl Harbor on 4 June for Eniwetok, arriving ten days later, and from this base escorted an oiler task unit which refueled task force TF 53 at sea on 20 June at the close of the Battle of the Philippine Sea, and TF 58 during the raid on the Bonins on 24 June.

Between 6 July and 1 September 1944 Deede served as screening and patrol ship during the assault and capture of the Marianas. After a brief overhaul at Eniwetok, she escorted  to Guadalcanal, then on 2 October joined the escort for a convoy to recently invaded Peleliu. She continued convoy duty-aiding in the occupation of the Palaus until 17 November when she sailed for Pearl Harbor.

Supporting Iwo Jima operations
Deede served as escort and target in the training of submarines out of Pearl Harbor until 6 February 1945 when she got underway to escort a convoy of cargo and transport ships to reinforce the recent landings on Iwo Jima, arriving on 23 February. She remained off Iwo Jima on patrol until 20 March when she screened the transports returning the 4th Marines to Pearl Harbor, arriving on 4 April.

Stateside overhaul 
After overhaul at San Francisco and training at San Diego and Pearl Harbor, Deede joined the replenishment group for the 3rd Fleet at Ulithi on 21 July, operating with this group during the final air raids and bombardments on the Japanese mainland. Four days later she got underway for Pearl Harbor where she served with the Hawaiian Sea Frontier from 17 October to 19 November.

Decommissioning 
Deede arrived at San Francisco on 25 November, was decommissioned there on 9 January 1946, and sold on 12 June 1947.

Awards 
Deede was awarded six battle stars for World War II service.

References

External links

 
 Ships of the U.S. Navy, 1940–1945 DE-263 USS Deede
 uboat.net – Evarts class Destroyer Escorts

Evarts-class destroyer escorts
World War II frigates and destroyer escorts of the United States
Ships built in Boston
1943 ships